Atractylodes lancea (syns. Atractylodes chinensis, Atractylodes japonica, Atractylodes ovata) is a species of flowering plant in the family Asteraceae, native to Vietnam, most of China, Korea, the southern Russian Far East, and Japan. It is the source of cāng zhú, a Chinese herbal medicine sold to people suffering from a variety of ailments.

References

Cynareae
Plants used in traditional Chinese medicine
Flora of Vietnam
Flora of Southeast China
Flora of South-Central China
Flora of North-Central China
Flora of Inner Mongolia
Flora of Manchuria
Flora of Korea
Flora of Japan
Flora of Primorsky Krai
Flora of Amur Oblast
Flora of Khabarovsk Krai
Plants described in 1838